Liba Taub (born 1954) is an American historian of science, now Curator of the Whipple Museum in Cambridge, UK.

Taub completed a doctorate in 1987 at the University of Oklahoma. She held the position of Curator at the Adler Planetarium.
Much of her research goes into ancient Greek and Roman astronomy, physics and meteorology and researching the history of scientific instruments. She became a Fellow of Newnham College in 1996 and serves as a professor of History and Philosophy of Science. Taub has been an Einstein Visiting Fellow at the Excellence Cluster Topoi in Berlin since 2010, in which she has participated in various workshops and workshops on Ancient Greek and Roman scientific writing. She has authored books such as Ptolemy’s Universe: The Natural Philosophical and Ethical Foundations of Ptolemy’s Astronomy (1993), Ancient Meteorology (2003), and Aetna and the Moon: Explaining Nature in Ancient Greece and Rome (2008).

Notes

American women historians
1954 births
Living people
Historians of ancient Rome
American historians of science
University of Oklahoma alumni
Academics of the University of Cambridge
21st-century American women